David Marshall Nissman (born 1953) is a former U.S. Attorney for the District of the Virgin Islands.

Born in Queens, New York, Nissman graduated magna cum laude from Emory University and later earned a J.D. from the University of Oregon.

On April 18, 2002, Nissman was appointed by President George W. Bush as the 19th U.S. Attorney for the District of the Virgin Islands.

During his tenure the U.S. Attorney prosecuted many high-profile cases, including a case against the V.I. government for fraudulently circumventing the competitive process and awarding a $3.6 million contract for major sewer repairs on St. Croix to a local company with no experience. The government later cancelled the contract.

After his retirement in 2004, the U.S. Attorney's Office Building on St. Croix was named the David Marshall Nissman Justice Center.

He is currently a senior partner of ILP + McChain Miller Nissman.

Nissman is also an author. Among his books, Proving Federal Crimes (Corpus Juris Publishing) was named Amazon.com top ten law books of 2001.

Personal life
Nissman has two sons. His youngest son, Alexander Nissman, is a member of the United States Virgin Islands national soccer team. His oldest son Michael Nissman is an independent filmmaker.

References

1953 births
Living people
United States Attorneys for the District of the Virgin Islands